Heliotron J is a fusion research device in Japan, specifically a helical-axis heliotron designed to study plasma confinement in this type of device. It is located at the Institute of Advanced Energy of Kyoto University.

References

Stellarators
Nuclear technology in Japan